= Liena Vayzman =

American photographer

Liena Vayzman (born 1971) is an American photographer, art historian and curator. Her work is included in the collections of the Whitney Museum of American Art and the RISD Museum.
